The Royal Giants is the name of three different baseball teams:
Boston Royal Giants
Brooklyn Royal Giants
Kansas City Royal Giants